Grandon Rhodes (born Grandon Neviers Augustine Rolker; August 7, 1904 – June 9, 1987) was an American actor.

Early years 
Rhodes was born in Jersey City, New Jersey.

Career 
Early in his career, Rhodes acted in repertory theatre with troupes in Montreal, Oklahoma City, Omaha, and Hartford, among other places. His film debut came in Follow the Boys (1944).

In addition to numerous film appearances, he was also a regular in two long-running television shows, playing the doctor in Bonanza and the judge in Perry Mason. He also appeared in a recurring role as Beverly Hills banker Chester Vanderlip throughout most of the run of The George Burns and Gracie Allen Show.

Rhodes acted in repertory theatre in Hartford, Montreal, Oklahoma City, and Omaha. In January 1932, He became the leading man of the Auditorium Permanent Players in Rochester, New York. Rhodes's Broadway credits included A Boy Who Lived Twice (1945), The Deep Mrs. Sykes (1945), Flight to the West (1940), Abe Lincoln in Illinois (1938), Ceiling Zero (1935), Lost Horizons (1934), and Antony and Cleopatra (1924).

Personal life and death 
Rhodes was married to actress Ruth Lee. He died two months before his 83rd birthday in Encino, California.

Selected filmography

 Ship Ahoy (1942) - Lt. Cmdr. Thurston (uncredited)
 Shadow of a Doubt (1943) - Rev. MacCurdy (uncredited)
 Hit Parade of 1943 (1943) - Escort (uncredited)
 Action in the North Atlantic (1943) - Lieutenant Commander (uncredited)
 Corvette K-225 (1943) - Lieutenant (uncredited)
 The Impostor (1944) - Captain
 Ladies Courageous (1944) - Briefing Officer (uncredited)
 The Fighting Sullivans (1944) - Naval Doctor (uncredited)
 Lady in the Dark (1944) - Reporter (uncredited)
 Follow the Boys (1944) - George Grayson (uncredited)
 Sensations of 1945 (1944) - Doctor (uncredited)
 Raiders of Ghost City (1944, Serial) - Major Bell (Ch's 1 & 9) (uncredited)
 Wilson (1944) - White House Reporter (uncredited)
 The Doughgirls (1944) - First Hotel Clerk (uncredited)
 Our Hearts Were Young and Gay (1944) - Clerk (uncredited)
 Practically Yours (1944) - Mac (uncredited)
 Roughly Speaking (1945) - Jewelry Salesman (uncredited)
 Hollywood and Vine (1945) - Attorney Wilson - replaced by Charles Middleton (scenes deleted)
 Nob Hill (1945) - Devereaux (uncredited)
 Magnificent Doll (1946) - Thomas Jefferson
 Born to Kill (1947) - Inspector Wilson
 Too Many Winners (1947) - John Hardeman
 Ride the Pink Horse (1947) - Mr. Edison
 Song of Love (1947) - Reinecke's Companion (uncredited)
 High Wall (1947) - Dr. Ederman (uncredited)
 Song of My Heart (1948) - Doctor
 Big Town Scandal (1948) - Judge Hogan (uncredited)
 Walk a Crooked Mile (1948) - Adolph Mizner (uncredited)
 Larceny (1948) - Harry Carson (uncredited)
 The Gentleman from Nowhere (1948) - Edward Dixon
 Road House (1948) - Judge
 Blondie's Secret (1948) - Ken Marcy
 Trouble Preferred (1948) - Ed Larson (uncredited)
 Miss Mink of 1949 (1949) - Nietsche aka Imhoff Schultz
 The Clay Pigeon (1949) - Naval Intelligence Agent Clark
 Tucson (1949) - Dean Sherman
 Streets of Laredo (1949) - Phil Jessup
 Canadian Pacific (1949) - Dr. Mason
 It Happens Every Spring (1949) - Professor (uncredited)
 White Heat (1949) - Dr. Harris (uncredited)
 All the King's Men (1949) - Floyd McEvoy
 Tell It to the Judge (1949) - Ken Craig
 And Baby Makes Three (1949) - Phelps Burbridge - Lawyer (uncredited)
 Dancing in the Dark (1949) - Producer (uncredited)
 The Lady Takes a Sailor (1949) - Dr. Newman (uncredited)
 Life of St. Paul Series (1949) - Luke
 Women from Headquarters (1950) - Richard Cott
 The Eagle and the Hawk (1950) - Gov. Lubbock
 The Lost Volcano (1950) - Dr. Charles Langley
 Wyoming Mail (1950) - Sen. Dowell (uncredited)
 Tripoli (1950) - Cmmdre. Barron
 The Second Face (1950) - Floyd Moran
 The Du Pont Story (1950) - President Thomas Jefferson
 The Flying Missile (1950) - Capt. Whitaker (uncredited)
 Born Yesterday (1950) - Sanborn
 Storm Warning (1951) - Pike (uncredited)
 Take Care of My Little Girl (1951) - Prof. H. Benson (uncredited)
 Force of Arms (1951) - Army Doctor (uncredited)
 The Guy Who Came Back (1951) - Captain Shallock (uncredited)
 Criminal Lawyer (1951) - Judge J. Larrabee (uncredited)
 Detective Story (1951) - Det. O'Brien
 Come Fill the Cup (1951) - Dr. Ross (uncredited)
 The Golden Horde (1951) - Emir (uncredited)
 Elopement (1951) - Minor Role (uncredited)
 Indian Uprising (1952) - Thatcher - Arizona Territorial Delegate (uncredited)
 Boots Malone (1952) - Drunk at Horse Auction (uncredited)
 The Sniper (1952) - Warren Fitzpatrick (uncredited)
 Cripple Creek (1952) - W.S. Drummond, Secret Service Chief (uncredited)
 Angel Face (1953) - Prison Chaplain (uncredited)
 On Top of Old Smoky (1953) - Doc Judson
 House of Wax (1953) - Surgeon (uncredited)
 The System (1953) - District Attorney Dunlop (uncredited)
 A Blueprint for Murder (1953) - Probate Judge James J. Adams (uncredited)
 So Big (1953) - Bainbridge (uncredited)
 Three Sailors and a Girl (1953) - George Abbott (uncredited)
 Bad for Each Other (1953) - Dr. Walter Messenger (uncredited)
 Secret of the Incas (1954) - Mr. Winston (uncredited)
 Them! (1954) - Alcoholic Ward Doctor (uncredited)
 Human Desire (1954) - John Owens
 A Star Is Born (1954) - Producer at Premiere (uncredited)
 Revenge of the Creature (1955) - Jackson Foster
 The Eternal Sea (1955) - Admiral at CIMPAC Meeting (uncredited)
 Headline Hunters (1955) - Magistrate (uncredited)
 The McConnell Story (1955) - Major at Hearing (uncredited)
 Illegal (1955) - John Seltzer (uncredited)
 Trial (1955) - Prof. Terry Bliss (uncredited)
 A Man Alone (1955) - Luke Joiner
 Texas Lady (1955) - Nickerson (uncredited)
 Miracle in the Rain (1956) - Mr. Baldwin, City Editor (uncredited)
 Earth vs. the Flying Saucers (1956) - Gen. Edmunds
 These Wilder Years (1956) - Roy Oliphant
 Tension at Table Rock (1956) - Judge (uncredited)
 The Rack (1956) - General (uncredited)
 The 27th Day (1957) - UN Presiding Officer (uncredited)
 The Wayward Girl (1957) - District Attorney Nevins
 Jailhouse Rock (1957) - Prof. August van Alden (uncredited)
 The Notorious Mr. Monks (1958) - Mr. Hadley
 The FBI Story (1959) - Minister at Funeral (uncredited)
 The Bramble Bush (1960) - Judge Manning
 Oklahoma Territory (1960) - George Blackwell
 Tess of the Storm Country (1960) - Mr. Foley
 The Honeymoon Machine (1961) - U.S. Senator (uncredited)
 Where Love Has Gone (1964) - Banker (uncredited)
 Fluffy (1965) - Professor (uncredited)

References

External links

 
 

1904 births
1987 deaths
20th-century American male actors
Male actors from Jersey City, New Jersey
American male television actors
American male film actors
Male actors from Los Angeles
American male stage actors